Old Chalford is a hamlet in Enstone civil parish, about  east of Chipping Norton, Oxfordshire.

Old Chalford is on the River Glyme, which is dammed in the hamlet forming a number of ponds. The Wychwood Way long distance footpath passes through the hamlet.

References

Hamlets in Oxfordshire
West Oxfordshire District